Eugeniusz Szaposznikow (17 July 19178 July 1991) was a Polish fighter ace of the Polish Air Force in World War II with 8 confirmed kills and one shared.

Biography
Szaposznikow took part in the September campaign in the 111th Fighter Escadrille. On 1 September he damaged a He 111. After the campaign he crossed the border with Romania, then he came to France where he was posted to the Cebrzyński section of the Groupe de Chasse II/5. After the French capitulation he arrived in the United Kingdom. From 2 August 1940 he was assigned to No. 303 Polish Fighter Squadron.

He took part in the Battle of Britain. From 31 August to 7 October he shot down eight German aircraft. In May 1941 he became instructor in 8 OTU. On 14 December 1943 he was sent to No. 316 Polish Fighter Squadron, on 21 December 1943 he returned to No. 303 squadron.

After the war ended he stayed in the UK and changed his name to Sharman.

Eugeniusz Szaposznikow died on 8 July 1991 in Nottingham.

Aerial victory credits
 He 111 - 1 September 1939 (damaged)
 1/3 Hs 126 - Battle of France
 Bf 109 - 31 August 1940
 Do 215 - 7 September 1940 
 Bf 109 - 7 September 1940 
 2 x Bf 110 - 11 September 1940 
 Bf 109 - 23 September 1940 
 Bf 109 - 27 September 1940 
 Bf 109 - 7 October 1940 and one damaged

Awards
 Virtuti Militari, Silver Cross 
 Cross of Valour (Poland), four times
 Cross of Merit (Poland)
 Distinguished Flying Medal

Military promotions
 podporucznik - November 1941
 porucznik - 1 November 1942
 kapitan - 1 November 1944

References

Further reading
 Arkady Fiedler Squadron 303 (book) 
 
 Tadeusz Jerzy Krzystek, Anna Krzystek: Polskie Siły Powietrzne w Wielkiej Brytanii w latach 1940-1947 łącznie z Pomocniczą Lotniczą Służbą Kobiet (PLSK-WAAF). Sandomierz: Stratus, 2012, p. 550. 

 Piotr Sikora: Asy polskiego lotnictwa. Warszawa: Oficyna Wydawnicza Alma-Press. 2014, p. 256-280. 
 Józef Zieliński: Asy polskiego lotnictwa. Warszawa: Agencja lotnicza ALTAIR, 1994, p. 37. ISBN 83862172. 

 Józef Zieliński: Lotnicy polscy w Bitwie o Wielką Brytanię. Warszawa: Oficyna Wydawnicza MH, 2005, p. 197-198.

External links
 rathbonemuseum.com
 samoloty.pl
 Bitwa o Anglię w polityka.pl - zdjęcia

1991 deaths
1917 births
The Few
Polish World War II flying aces
Recipients of the Silver Cross of the Virtuti Militari
Recipients of the Cross of Valour (Poland)
Recipients of the Cross of Merit (Poland)
Polish Royal Air Force pilots of World War II
Recipients of the Distinguished Flying Medal